The Weems House, also known as Fowler Cottage, is a historic residence in Mobile, Alabama.  Completed in 1870, the one-story frame structure is a late example of the Greek Revival-style.  It was added to the National Register of Historic Places on October 7, 1982.  The house functioned as a private residence until July 18, 1991, when it was purchased by the Dragons Civic and Social Club, a local fraternal organization.

References

National Register of Historic Places in Mobile, Alabama
Houses on the National Register of Historic Places in Alabama
Houses in Mobile, Alabama
Greek Revival houses in Alabama
Houses completed in 1870